Little Huia is a western coastal settlement of West Auckland, Auckland, New Zealand and forms part of the Waitākere Ranges Regional Park, bordering the Manukau Harbour. It is located south-west of the settlement of Huia.

Geography

The settlement is found in the lower Waitākere Ranges, where the Marama Stream forms a valley as it flows into the Manukau Harbour. South of the settlement is Te Kā-a-Maki / Jackie Hill, a headland in the Manukau Harbour. At the base of this headland is Kaiteke Point, the western-most opening of the Huia Bay.

The Little Huia area is dominated by a warm lowlands pūriri forest. The coastline between Whatipu and Little Huia is a unique ecosystem in the area as it is semi-exposed to the Tasman Sea, leading to a diverse pūriri/pōhutukawa forest that includes nīkau, Coprosma arborea and Sophora fulvida. Pittosporum ellipticum, otherwise rare in the Waitākere Ranges, is relatively common on dry hillsides sheltered from saltspray.

History

The settlement is in the traditional rohe of Te Kawerau ā Maki, close to the location of Te Komoki, one of the few West Auckland pā to have defensive ditches. Te Komoki pā site is located at Te Kā-a-Maki / Jackie Hill, a 148-metre hill to the south of Little Huia. The pā has 12 terrances and five pits, protected by cliff faces on three sides and a ditch on the fourth. Te Komoki is one of the best preserved pā of the Waitākere Ranges. The name for the hill, Te Kā-a-Maki ("The Fires of Maki"), refers to Maki, the eponymous ancestor of Te Kawerau ā Maki.

Kaiteke Point ("feigning eating"), the south-western point of Huia Bay, is named after a traditional story involving a Waikato Tainui chief who visited the northern shores of the Manukau Harbour. Travelling westwards, he was welcomed by the people of Huia with a feast of tarakihi fish. On the other side of the bay, he was welcomed with a second feast. Too full from the tarakihi but too polite to refuse, the chief feigned eating the food from the feast. This legend gave rise to the name of the eastern point of Huia Bay, Kaitarakihi Point, and the western, Kaiteke Point.

In the early 1860s, the Gibbons family established a dam for kauri logging on the Marama Stream, near modern-day Little Huia. The stream was named after an early resident, Jackie Marama, a Pākehā Māori settler who lived at the mouth of the stream in the 1860s. In the 1880s, the Barr family settled at Little Huia, followed by Edward Turner in 1891. The Barr family constructed a second dam of the Marama Stream in the early 1900s. In 1907, a ferry wharf was built at Little Huia. Members of the Turner family continue to own land near Huia in the present day.

Demographics
Statistics New Zealand considers Little Huia as part of the Huia rural settlement.

The SA1 statistical area had a population of 126 at the 2018 New Zealand census, an increase of 9 people (7.7%) since the 2013 census, and unchanged since the 2006 census. There were 57 households, comprising 57 males and 66 females, giving a sex ratio of 0.86 males per female. The median age was 46.0 years (compared with 37.4 years nationally), with 24 people (19.0%) aged under 15 years, 12 (9.5%) aged 15 to 29, 72 (57.1%) aged 30 to 64, and 18 (14.3%) aged 65 or older.

Ethnicities were 95.2% European/Pākehā, 14.3% Māori, 4.8% Pacific peoples, 2.4% Asian, and 0.0% other ethnicities. People may identify with more than one ethnicity.

Although some people chose not to answer the census's question about religious affiliation, 73.8% had no religion, 16.7% were Christian, 2.4% were Buddhist and 0.0% had other religions.

Of those at least 15 years old, 24 (23.5%) people had a bachelor's or higher degree, and 18 (17.6%) people had no formal qualifications. The median income was $31,800, compared with $31,800 nationally. 15 people (14.7%) earned over $70,000 compared to 17.2% nationally. The employment status of those at least 15 was that 48 (47.1%) people were employed full-time, 18 (17.6%) were part-time, and 3 (2.9%) were unemployed.

References

Print references

Populated places around the Manukau Harbour
Populated places in the Auckland Region
Waitākere Ranges
Waitākere Ranges Local Board Area
West Auckland, New Zealand